Divíšek (feminine Divíšková) is a Czech surname. Notable people include:
 Josef Divíšek, Czech footballer
 Michal Divíšek, Czech ice hockey player
 Nina Divíšková, Czech actress
 Tamara Divíšková, Czech artist
 Tomáš Divíšek, Czech ice hockey player

See also 
 Diviš, Czech surname

Czech-language surnames